Je lutte donc je suis (French: I fight therefore I am) is a documentary film about social and political struggles in Greece and Spain, realized by Yannis Youlountas, in September 2015, in France. The title is made from the aphorism of the philosopher René Descartes Cogito ergo sum (I think therefore I am). Although it was not distributed by any mainstream company, it has had a very large success, and has been shown to numerous theaters, festivals, in France and in Europe. It received two awards. The film is available under a Creative Commons license.

Synopsis 

 Type: documentary
 Format: 16/9

Speakers 
People speaking play their own role.

 Diego Cañamero, Andalusian activist and trade-unionist.
 Gabriel Colletis, professor of economy at Toulouse 1 University Capitole.
 Juan Manuel Sánchez Gordillo, Andalusian politician, mayor of Marinaleda, trade-unionist, and professor of history.
 Angélique Ionatos, Greek singer.
 Stathis Kouvelakis, professor of political philosophy at the King's College of London, previously member of SYRIZA central committee.
 Dimitris Papachristos, Greek journalist, member of the November 1973 insurrection against the Colonels dictature. ."
 Dimitris Poulikakos, Greek actor and singer, opponent of the Colonels dictature.
 Éric Toussaint, co-founder the international network of the Committee for the Abolition of Illegitimate Debt and coordinator of the Commission for the Truth on Greek debt in 2015.

Festivals 
 12th festival Terres de résistances, Martigues, 3–6 September 2015
 Festival Rencontres AD HOC, Mirabel et Blacons, 9–13 September 2015
 Festival du Livre et du film, Mouans-Sartoux, 2-4 Cctober 2015
 5th festival du Documentaire Politique et Social, Merlieux, 7–8 November 2015
 15th festival Cinéma Méditerranéen, Brusels, 4–11 December 2015
 7th festival of anarchist and activist films, Chambéry, 16–17 January 2016
 3rd festival Terre et avenir, Salon-de-Provence, 20–27 January 2016
 Festival Mémoires de Résistance, Digne-les-Bains, 27-30 janvier 2016
 Festival 1,2,3 Soleil, Châteaubriant, 28 February-7 March 2016
 Festival Diversité, Bourgogne-Franche-Comté, 23 March-8 April 2016
 8th festival de Saint-Martin, St-Martin-de-Valamas, 25 March-5 April 2016
 10th festival ciné d'ATTAC, Mont-de-Marsan, 29 March-2 April 2016
 10th festival du film antifasciste, Reims et Épernay, 3–18 May 2016
 Festival Origines, Vernoux-en-Vivarais et Valence, 3 June-3 July 2016
 20th festival of Resistances films, Foix, 8–16 July 2016
 7th international festival for direct democracy, Thessalonique, 7–9 September 2016

Popular success 

On 21 August 2015, the film is shown to the public for the first time, during a projection for the  600 members of the 52nd congress of the Freinet Pédagogie in Aix-en-Provence, in south of France. It gets a warm welcome, so that the congress adopts the slogan I fight so I am, and the newspaper l'Humanité uses this for its frontline.

On 2 April 2016, the film received the award Ciné d'ATTAC 2016 (Grain de sable d'or) à Mont-de-Marsan.

On 19 April 2016, the film is shown during the Nuit debout movement in Nîmes.

On 4 October 2016, the film received the award "Solidarity film" from the Human Rights Ligue in Orly.

Gallery

References

External links 
 Je lutte donc je suis on Youtube
 Official website

Documentary films about anarchism
French political films
Films shot in Greece
2010s French films